Guns of the Magnificent Seven is a 1969 Western, styled in the genre of a Zapata Western, the second sequel to the classic 1960 Western action film The Magnificent Seven, itself based on Akira Kurosawa's Seven Samurai (1954). The film was directed by Paul Wendkos and produced by Vincent M. Fennelly. It stars George Kennedy as Chris Adams, the character Yul Brynner portrayed in the first two films.

The additions to the cast to make up the "new" seven are Monte Markham, Bernie Casey, James Whitmore, Reni Santoni, Joe Don Baker and Scott Thomas. Each have their quirks and baggage. They band together to help free a Mexican revolutionary (Fernando Rey) and help fight the oppression of sadistic militarist Diego played by Michael Ansara. Elmer Bernstein once again provides the music.

Plot
In late 19th century Mexico, Federales capture Quintero (Fernando Rey), a revolutionary who attempts to rally those opposing the dictatorship of President Díaz. Before going to prison, Quintero gives his lieutenant, Maximiliano O'Leary (Reni Santoni), $600 with which to continue the cause. Bandit chief Carlos Lobero (Frank Silvera) demands that the money be used for guns and ammunition, but Max instead crosses the border in search of Chris Adams (George Kennedy): a legendary, American gunman whom his cousin had told him about. Max finally finds the laconic Chris, witnessing him free a man from a rigged trial, first by using his wits, then with the famed hair-trigger skill as a gunfighter.

Chris agrees to mount a rescue of Quintero and uses $500 of Max's money to recruit five highly trained combatants: Keno (Monte Markham), a horse thief and hand-to-hand combat expert (whom Chris saved from hanging); Cassie (Bernie Casey), a brawny but intelligent former slave, who can handle dynamite; Slater (Joe Don Baker), a one-armed, sideshow sharp-shootist; a tubercular wrangler called "P.J." (Scott Thomas), and Levi Morgan (James Whitmore), an aging family man who is doubtful of his worth, despite his incredible knife-throwing skills.

En route to Mexico, the motley band of Americans becomes less mercenary when observing the brutal treatment of the peasants. Their journey is marked by encounters with a political prisoner's little boy, Emiliano Zapata (Tony Davis) and a pretty peasant girl, Tina (Wende Wagner), who falls in love with P.J. When Lobero learns that Max did not buy guns with the $600, he refuses to allow his men to take part in Quintero's rescue. Realizing that he needs support, Chris frees a prison gang that includes Zapata's father, then trains them in military tactics.

Despite their superior fighting skills and strategy, Chris' men are outnumbered and their valiant effort to free Quintero appears doomed. At the last moment, 50 of Lobero's bandits, having slain their leader for his lack of patriotism, thunder onto the prison grounds and turn the tide of battle. Of the original seven, only Chris, Max and Levi survive. Before riding home, Chris and Levi leave behind the $600 the peasants had collected.

Cast

The Seven
 George Kennedy as Chris Adams
 James Whitmore as Levi Morgan
 Monte Markham as Keno
 Reni Santoni as Maximiliano "Max" O'Leary
 Bernie Casey as Cassie
 Scott Thomas as P.J. Scurlock
 Joe Don Baker as Matt Slater

Others
 Tony Davis as Emilio Zapata
 Michael Ansara as Colonel Diego
 Frank Silvera as Lobero
 Wende Wagner as Tina
 Sancho Gracia as Miguel
 Luis Rivera as Lieutenant Prensa
 George Rigaud as Gabriel
 Fernando Rey as Angel Quintero
 Peter Lawman as Carlos

Production
Guns of the Magnificent Seven was preceded by Return of the Seven in 1966, and followed by The Magnificent Seven Ride! in 1972. Executive producer Walter Mirisch felt that in the unpredictable market of filmgoers, there was safety in familiar material.  Yul Brynner did not want to return to the role of Chris; the role was taken by George Kennedy, then at a height of popularity after winning his Academy Award for Cool Hand Luke (1967).

Mirisch surrounded Kennedy with a strong cast, with  Monte Markham giving a thinly-disguised Steve McQueen-like performance, in the same wardrobe McQueen wore in The Magnificent Seven. Elmer Bernstein was on hand to reprise part of original score of The Magnificent Seven and adding new elements. Mirisch also had his contract director Paul Wendkos direct.  The producer of the film, Vincent M. Fennelly, had worked with Mirisch at Monogram and had produced the Clint Eastwood Western TV series Rawhide.

Guns of the Magnificent Seven did very well at the international box office. In a bit of unfortunate timing, as reviewer Stuart Galbraith IV remarked, "The picture hit theaters in July 1969 – the very same time as 'The Wild Bunch'; the two films have somewhat similar stories but, needless to say, Sam Peckinpah's landmark film is otherwise light years ahead of this unambitious rehash."

Guns of the Magnificent Seven was filmed in Panavision at locales in Spain, as was the previous Return of the Seven. Most "Spaghetti Westerns" were made on low budgets, using inexpensive locales resembling the semiarid landscapes of the American Southwest and Northern Mexico. A popular setting was the Tabernas Desert in the Province of Almería in southeastern Spain, at the studios of Texas Hollywood, Mini Hollywood and Western Leone.

Reception

Critical response
Guns of the Magnificent Seven was not well received by critics. In his review for The New York Times, Howard Thompson noted the film suffered from poor production values, and a derivative plot, "It's the same old iron-jawed, cowboy seven, with new actors and all the magnificence of a dead burro."

The review in Variety was more kind. "Guns of the Magnificent Seven is a handy follow-up to the 1960 original 'Magnificent Seven' and 'Return of the Seven'. It rises above a routine story line via rugged treatment and action builds to a blazing gunplay climax."

Release
Guns of the Magnificent Seven opened at the Milgram theatre in Philadelphia on May 28, 1969 and grossed $24,000 in its first week.

Home media
The film was released on DVD on January 31, 2006, by MGM Home Entertainment.

References

Notes

Citations

Bibliography

 Mirisch, Walter. I Thought We Were Making Movies, Not History. Madison, Wisconsin: University of Wisconsin Press, 2008. .

External links

 
 
 
 
 

1969 films
1969 Western (genre) films
American sequel films
American Western (genre) films
Films scored by Elmer Bernstein
Films directed by Paul Wendkos
Seven Samurai
United Artists films
Films shot in Almería
Magnificent Seven films
1960s English-language films
1960s American films
1960s Japanese films